Of Cities is the second studio album by American hip hop producer DJ Signify. It was released on Bully Records on January 20, 2009. It features guest appearances from Aesop Rock and Matt Kelly.

Critical reception

Dave Segal of The Stranger gave the album a favorable review, stating, "Signify gives us 16 tracks—including six brief interludes ripe for bumper usage in NPR's hipper segments—on Of Cities that bring the funk, but stoically, with urban grime and urbane grimness." Jennifer Marston of XLR8R said: "He's still pushing his drum-heavy style, which is tight as ever, but he's also reeled in shades of glitch, new wave, Kraut-rock, and other genres for the tracks."

PopMatters named it the 3rd best instrumental hip hop album of 2009.

Track listing

Personnel
Credits adapted from liner notes.

 DJ Signify – turntables, production, arrangement, mixing
 Aesop Rock – vocals (2, 11), lyrics (2, 11)
 Matt Kelly – additional arrangement (2, 7, 16), guitar (5), keyboards (5)
 Blockhead – co-production (4, 9)
 Joe Beats – engineering
 Harris Newman – mastering
 Paul "Quo" Kwiakowski – artwork, layout
 Todd Lown – photography
 Chris Bryant – photography

References

External links
 

2009 albums
DJ Signify albums
Albums produced by Blockhead (music producer)